The Museum Tavern is a Grade II listed public house at 49 Great Russell Street, Bloomsbury, London.

It was built from about 1855–64 by William Finch Hill and Edward Lewis Paraire.  It traces its origins back to 1723. From 1723 to 1762 the pub was called the Dog and Duck (so called because duck hunting was popular in the ponds in the Long Fields behind Montagu House in the 17th and 18th centuries).

It is a CAMRA Heritage Pub, with a Regionally Important historic interior. Unusually, it is a regular outlet for Theakston's Old Peculier on cask.

Karl Marx was a notable regular to this pub as it was in close proximity to the British Museum Reading Room, where he wrote Das Kapital.

References

Buildings and structures completed in 1864
Buildings and structures in Bloomsbury
19th-century architecture in the United Kingdom
Grade II listed buildings in the London Borough of Camden
Grade II listed pubs in London
Pubs in the London Borough of Camden